Mount Leland is a rock peak  west of Victoria Upper Glacier in Victoria Land, Antarctica. It was named by the Advisory Committee on Antarctic Names for Captain Bainbridge B. Leland, Commanding Officer of  during Operation Deep Freeze 1968 and 1969.

References

Mountains of Victoria Land
Scott Coast